Shackletonia is a genus of lichen-forming fungi in the family Teloschistaceae, they are lichenicolous, and muscicolous species and known from Antarctica and southern Patagonia (Arup et al. 2013).

The genus was circumscribed by Ulrik Søchting, Patrik Frödén and Ulf Arup in Nordic J. Bot. vol.31 (1) on page 55 in 2013.

The genus name of Shackletonia is in honour of Sir Ernest Henry Shackleton (1874–1922), who was an Anglo-Irish Antarctic explorer who led three British expeditions to the Antarctic. 

According to phylogenetic analysis the genera Erichansenia and Shackletonia are positioned on the outermost position to the other genera of the Xanthorioideae subfamily, similarly as in phylogenetic trees published by Arup et al. (2013), Søchting et al. (2014b), and Garrido-Benavent et al. (2016). The genus Shackletonia is distinguished from other Xanthorioideae groups by its unique chemistry, producing 5- and 7-chloroemodin and their derivatives.

Shackletonia hertelii and Shackletonia siphonospora have been found in the Falkland Islands.

They are a nutrient source of Amphipoda in the Antarctica.

Species 
As accepted by Species Fungorum;
Shackletonia buelliae 
Shackletonia hertelii 
Shackletonia insignis  - Livingston Island
Shackletonia siphonospora 

In September 2022, a new species of lichen was found on James Ross Island (in the Antarctic Peninsula), Shackletonia backorii.

Former species;
 S. cryodesertorum  = Erichansenia cryodesertorum
 S. sauronii  = Erichansenia sauronii

References

Teloschistales
Teloschistales genera
Lichen genera
Taxa described in 2013